The Fisticuffs are an Irish punk rock band hailing from the south side of Chicago. Formed in 2005, the band consists of Bob Baldwin (vocals, harmonica), Dave Beneventi (mandolin), Neal Farrell (bass), Tony Dellorto (drums), Arcadia Kust (fiddle), and Sean Moriarty (electric guitar).

History
The line-up of musicians has changed over the years, but founding members Tony Dellorto, Bob Baldwin and Dave Beneventi have remained the same. Arcadia Kust, fiddle, joined the band in late 2005, Sean Moriarty, guitar, joined in fall 2006 and Neal Farrell, bass, joined in 2009.

The Fisticuffs released their debut album, Bruised But Not Beaten, on March 17, 2006. The second album, Neatly Stumblin''', was released in March 2008. You'll Not Take Us Alive'', the band’s third full-length release, was released on February 1, 2011.

Discography

Studio albums

External links
Official Fisticuffs Website
Official Fisticuffs Myspace
Buy CD's on CDBaby

American folk rock groups
Musical groups established in 2005
Musical groups from Chicago
2005 establishments in Illinois